Mark Thorpe Abraham (born November 13, 1953) is a businessman and politician from Lake Charles. Since 2020, he has represented the 25th district in the Louisiana State Senate; he was previously a state representative for the 36th district from 2016 to 2020.

Career
In the October 24, 2015 primary election, Abraham, with 5,607 votes (54.6 percent), defeated another Republican candidate, Keith DeSonier, who polled 4,654 votes (45.4 percent).

He is a former Republican member of the Louisiana House of Representatives for District 36 in Calcasieu Parish in southwestern Louisiana. On January 11, 2016, he succeeded the term-limited Republican Representative Chuck Kleckley, also the former Speaker of the Louisiana House of Representatives.

In 2019, Abraham won election to the 25th district in the State Senate, succeeding term-limited incumbent Republican Dan Morrish.

References

1953 births
Living people
People from Lake Charles, Louisiana
American real estate businesspeople
Businesspeople from Louisiana
Republican Party members of the Louisiana House of Representatives
Louisiana city council members
Louisiana State University alumni
LSU Tigers football players
21st-century American politicians